"Aurora" is the third single released by British quintet Lights.Action!. It was released 7 April, before their debut mini-album, All Eyes to the Morning Sun through iTunes and other major DSPs.

The song is based on a poem written by Patrick Currier, which is a letter to his imaginary future daughter, called Aurora, who is confronted with the end of the world. He imagines speaking to her and soothing her, despite the fact that the skies are filled with exploding bombs and the world is being torn apart. He tries to put it across that the explosions are just a lightshow for her, like the Northern Lights, her namesake.

Music video
The video was filmed in a field in Surrey on a cold night. The idea behind it is that the band are trying to put the sun back in the sky.

Personnel
Patrick Currier - vocalsKarl Bareham - GuitarChris Moorhead - Guitar/KeysAlex Leeder - BassSteven Durham - drums
George Fafalios - Director, EditingHannah Clayton - CostumeMark Fafalios, Lewis Jones - Gaffer.

References

2008 singles
Lights Action songs
2008 songs